The Levy en Masse Act 1803 (43 Geo. 3 c. 96) was an Act of the Parliament of the United Kingdom. Although formally presented as an amendment of the Defence of the Realm Act 1803, it was actually a major piece of new legislation as it required counties in Great Britain to draw up lists of men for military training and detailed how compulsory training would take place. However, the Act included clauses that military training could be suspended if sufficient numbers of men joined volunteer corps, and the huge increase in their number in response to the Act meant that compulsory military training was never used.

The Act
The Act revived the idea of posse comitatus and detailed mechanisms for military training in each parish in Britain. It stated that Lords Lieutenant and their deputies should list all men between seventeen and fifty-five except clergymen, Quakers, school masters, and the infirm. The list would be classified into four classes: unmarried men under thirty with no living children under ten years of age; unmarried men aged between thirty and fifty, with no living children under ten; married men between seventeen and thirty with no more than two living children under ten; and those not included in the previous classifications. They would then be trained, armed and eligible in case of invasion to be called out anywhere in the British Isles.

Passage
Charles Philip Yorke (then Secretary at War) introduced the legislation as a 'Military Service Bill' on 18 July 1803 and it was passed quickly through Parliament, receiving royal assent on the 27 July. The detail of the passing of the bill through Parliament were:

House of Commons
 Ordered: 18 July 1803
 Presented, read, committed; considered; reported 18 July: 1803
 Recommitted and considered: 20 July 1803
 Passed Commons: 22 July 1803  
House of Lords
 Amendments: 26 July 1803
 Amendments considered and agreed to: 26 July 1803
Royal assent
 27 July 1803

Implementation
The Act was never raised for training due to the massive number of volunteers.

Amendments

The Act was amended by the Levy en Masse Amendment Act 1803 (43 Geo. 3 c. 120), passed on 11 August, which stated, amongst other things, that if the number of volunteers in any county was satisfactory to the King he could suspend the operation of the Levy en Masse Act even if they did not amount to the three-fourths of the first classification.

External links
 Bill to amend Act to enable H.M. to provide for Defence of Realm, and to exercise Prerogative in requiring Military Service in case of Invasion
 Full text of 43 Geo. 3 c. 96 Levy en Masse Act
 Full text of 43 Geo. 3 c. 120 Levy en Masse Amendment Act

Notes

United Kingdom Acts of Parliament 1803
19th-century military history of the United Kingdom
United Kingdom military law
Repealed United Kingdom Acts of Parliament
British defence policymaking